Yair Emanuel Marín (born 31 January 1990) is an Argentine professional footballer who plays as a centre-back for Chaco For Ever.

Career
Marín played for local clubs Viale FBC and Arsenal de Viale at youth level, before moving on to the academies of Newell's Old Boys, Central Córdoba and San Lorenzo. A move to Primera C Metropolitana then came with El Porvenir. He scored one goal in forty-two matches across two campaigns. Atlético Palmira of Torneo Argentino B signed Marín on 13 September 2013, one further goal across thirty-eight appearances followed. Marín joined Primera B Nacional side Gimnasia y Esgrima in 2015. Goals versus Estudiantes, Boca Unidos and Guillermo Brown occurred in 2015 as they suffered relegation to Torneo Federal A.

He remained with Gimnasia y Esgrima for three more seasons, which culminated with promotion back to tier two. Marín moved to Temperley in July 2018 but left after two games. On 20 January 2019, Primera B Nacional's Independiente Rivadavia became Marín's fifth senior club.

Career statistics
.

References

External links

1990 births
Living people
People from Paraná Department
Argentine footballers
Association football defenders
Primera C Metropolitana players
Torneo Argentino B players
Primera Nacional players
Torneo Federal A players
El Porvenir footballers
Gimnasia y Esgrima de Mendoza footballers
Club Atlético Temperley footballers
Independiente Rivadavia footballers
Chaco For Ever footballers
Sportspeople from Entre Ríos Province